Bulgan Gol-Ikh Ongog National Park is centered on the Bulgan River, which divides into many meandering streams, lakes, and wetlands as if flow through the valley in the park.  The area is an important stopover for migratory birds.  Species in the park include the vulnerable eastern imperial eagle, and the lesser kestrel.

Topography
The Bulgan River originates in the Altai Mountains of western Mongolia, and flows westward into Ulungur Lake in China.  The Bulgan River Valley is relatively broad and flat, permitting the meandering river to divide in many places to produce islands and riparian wetlands.

Climate and ecoregion
The climate of the area is cold semi-arid climate (Köppen climate classification (BSk)). This climate is characteristic of steppe climates intermediary between desert humid climates, and typically have precipitation is above evapotranspiration.  At least one month averages below .

Flora and fauna
Vegetation in the Bulgan River Valley is desert steppe.  The wetlands along the banks support reed beds and shrubs.  The area is important for migratory birds, and is used by notable species that include the vulnerable swan goose (Anser cygnoides), the vulnerable eastern imperial eagle (Aquila heliaca) and the lesser kestrel (Falco naumanni).  The site also supports the Eurasian beaver (Castor fiber).

See also
 List of national parks of Mongolia

References

External links
 Park borders, Bulgan Gol-Ikh Ongog National Park, ProtectedPlanet.net

National parks of Mongolia